is a Japanese rugby union player who plays as a Prop. He currently plays for Suntory Sungoliath in Japan's domestic Top League.

International
Morikawa received his first call-up to his country's wider training squad in April 2021, ahead of British and Irish Lions test. On 24 May, he was named in the 36-man squad for the match against the Sunwolves and tour of Scotland and Ireland.

References

External links
itsrugby.co.uk Profile

1993 births
Living people
Japanese rugby union players
Rugby union props
Tokyo Sungoliath players
21st-century Japanese people